Dixie Union is an unincorporated community  and census-designated place (CDP) in Ware County, Georgia, United States. It lies north of Waycross on U.S. Route 1 and 23. The community is part of the Waycross Micropolitan Statistical Area.

It was first listed as a CDP in the 2020 census with a population of 184.

Demographics

2020 census

Note: the US Census treats Hispanic/Latino as an ethnic category. This table excludes Latinos from the racial categories and assigns them to a separate category. Hispanics/Latinos can be of any race.

See also

References

Census-designated places in Ware County, Georgia
Unincorporated communities in Ware County, Georgia
Waycross, Georgia micropolitan area